Now That You Are a Dancer is the second studio album by Scottish indie pop band Kid Canaveral, released on 4 March 2013 by Scottish independent label Fence Records. The album was preceded by the single "Low Winter Sun" on 17 December 2012 and promotional single "The Wrench" on 11 February 2013.Now That You Are a Dancer was nominated for the 2014 Scottish Album of the Year Award.

Track listing
All songs written by David MacGregor, except where noted.

"The Wrench" – 2:40
"Who Would Want to Be Loved?" – 3:07
"Breaking Up Is the New Getting Married" – 3:19
"Who's Looking at You, Anyway?" – 4:07
"Skeletons" (Kate Lazda) – 4:15
"Low Winter Sun" – 4:18
"What We Don't Talk About" – 3:53
"Without a Backing Track" (Lazda) – 3:23
"So Sad, So Young" – 3:15
"A Compromise" – 7:49

Personnel
Kid Canaveral
 David MacGregor – vocals, guitar, keyboards, percussion
 Kate Lazda – vocals, guitar, keyboards
 Rose McConnachire – bass, vocals, keyboards
 Scott McMaster – drums, percussion

Additional personnel
 Gal – engineer, mixing, producer; programming on "Skeletons"
 Reuben Taylor – mastering

References

2013 albums
Kid Canaveral albums